Trapeziometacarpal osteoarthritis (TMC OA) is, also known as osteoarthritis at the base of the thumb, thumb carpometacarpal osteoarthritis, basilar (or basal) joint arthritis, or as rhizarthrosis. This joint is formed by the trapezium bone of the wrist and the metacarpal bone of the thumb. This is one of the joints where most humans develop osteoarthritis with age. Osteoarthritis is age-related loss of the smooth surface of the bone where it moves against another bone (cartilage of the joint). In reaction of this process the joint bones thicken at the surface, resulting in subchondral sclerosis. Also, bony outgrowths, called osteophytes, are formed at the joint margins.

The main symptom is pain, particularly with gripping and pinching. This pain is often described as weakness, but true weakness is not a part of this disease. People may also note a change in shape of the thumb. Some people choose surgery, but most people find they can accommodate trapeziometacarpal arthrthis.

Signs and symptoms

The symptom that brings people with TMC OA to the doctor is pain. Pain is typically experienced with gripping and pinching. People experience pain may describe it as weakness.

There may be fullness at the TMC joint. This area may be tender, meaning it is painful when pressed. There may also be hyperextension of the metacarpophalangeal joint. The thumb metacarpal deviates the middle of the hand (adduction). Also a grinding sound, known as crepitus, can be heard when the TMC joint is moved, more so when axial pressure is applied.

Etiology and Epidemiology

TMC OA is an expected part of aging in men and women equally. A population-based study of radiographic signs of pathophysiology in 3595 people assessed in a research-related comprehensive health examination found no association with physical workload. A study of people seeing a hand specialist for symptoms unrelated to TMC OA demonstrated no relationship of radiographic TMC OA to hand activity.

Studies that compare people presenting with TMC symptoms to people without symptoms are sometimes interpreted as indicating that activities can contribute to the development of TMC OA. A more accurate conclusion may be that hand use is associated with seeking care for symptoms related to TMC OA. Ligamentous laxity is often associated with TMC OA, but this is based on rationale rather than experimental evidence. Obesity may be related to TMC OA.

Anatomy

The TMC joint is a synovial joint between the trapezium bone of the wrist and the metacarpal bone at the base of the thumb. This joint is a so-called saddle joint (articulatio sellaris), unlike the CMC joints of the other four fingers which are ellipsoid joints. This means that the surfaces of the TMC joint are both concave and convex.

This shape provides the TMC joint a wide range of motion. Movements include:
 Flexion
 Extension
 Abduction
 Adduction
 Opposition
 Reposition
 Circumduction
The TMC joint is stabilized by 16 ligaments. Of these ligaments, the deep anterior oblique ligament, also known as the palmar beak ligament, is considered to be the most important stabilizing ligament.

Diagnosis
TMC OA is diagnosed based on symptoms and signs. Radiographs can confirm the diagnosis and the severity of TMC OA. Other diagnoses in this region include scaphotrapezial trapezoid arthritis and first dorsal compartment tendinopathy (De Quervain syndrome) although these are usually easy to distinguish.

Classification
TMC OA severity was classified by Eaton and Littler which can be simplified as follows:

Stage 1:
 slight widening of the joint space
 < 1/3 subluxation of the joint (in any projection)

Stage 2:
 Osteophytes,  in diameter, are present. (usually adjacent to the volar or dorsal facets of the trapezium)

Stage 3:
 Osteophytes,  in diameter, are present (usually adjacent to the volar and dorsal facets of the trapezium)
 Slight joint space narrowing

Stage 4:
 Narrow joint space
 Concomitant scaphotrapezial arthritis
A simpler classification is no arthritis, some arthritis, and severe arthritis. The omits the potentially contradictory details of the Eaton/Littler classification and keeps scaphotrapezial arthrosis separate.

Treatment
There are no treatments proved to slow or relieve TMC OA.  All treatments are symptom alleviating (palliative).  Most surgery is reconstructive—it removes the TMC joint. Metacarpal osteotomy was proposed as a potentially disease modifying surgery for more limited arthrosis, but there is no experimental support for this theory.  

There is limited and limited quality evidence regarding splints, corticosteroid injections, manual therapy and other palliative measures. Studies with adequate randomization, blinding, and independent assessment are lacking.

Arthrodesis fuses the TMC joint. It is uncommonly used. Arthroplasty surgery for TMC OA removes part or all of the trapezium. Surgery may also support the metacarpal by reconstructing a ligament using a tendon graft or weave.  Surgery may also interpose something in the space where the trapeziometacarpal joint was, either a tendon wrapped up into a ball or a prosthesis.

The best available evidence suggests no different in symptom alleviation with these variations of TMC arthroplasty.In one randomized trial comparing trapeziectomy alone with trapeziectomy with ligament reconstruction and trapeziectomy with ligament reconstruction and tendon interposition, patients evaluated 5 to 18 years after surgery had similar pain intensity, grip strength and key and tip pinch strengths after each procedure. Trapeziectomy alone is associated with fewer complications than the other procedures.

Trapeziectomy 
The most simple form out of the four variations is the trapeziectomy alone, also referred as the simple trapeziectomy. During this procedure, the trapezium bone is removed without any further surgical adjustments.The trapezium bone will be removed through an approximately three centimeter long incision along the lateral side of the thumb. To preserve surrounding structures, the trapezium bone will be removed through fragmentation of the bone (the bone will therefore be broken into pieces).

An empty gap is left by the trapeziectomy and the wound is closed with sutures. Despite this gap, no significant changes in function of the thumb are reported. After the surgery, the thumb will be immobilized with a cast.

Trapeziectomy with TI 
Some physicians still believe that it is better to fill the gap left by the trapeziectomy. They assume that filling the gap with a part of a tendon is preferable in terms of function, stability and position of the thumb. They are afraid that leaving a gap might result in complications such as shortening or subluxation of the thumb.

During trapeziectomy with TI, a tendon interposition is performed. A longitudinal strip of the palmaris longus tendon is separated. If this tendon is absent (which is the case in 13% of the population), half of the flexor carpi radialis tendon (FCR) can be used.

The tendon is then formed into a circular shape and placed in the gap, where it will be stabilized by sutures.

Trapeziectomy with LR 
Another technique used to assumable restore stability of the thumb, is a ligament reconstruction after a trapeziectomy is performed. The thought is that ligament reconstruction provides more stability to the thumb after removal of the trapezium bone.

During this procedure the anterior oblique ligament is reconstructed using the FCR tendon. There is a wide variety in techniques to perform this LR, but they all have a similar goal.

Trapeziectomy with LRTI 
Some physicians suppose that combining LR with TI results in an even better stabilised thumb.

Like the name already suggests, this procedure includes a combination of a trapeziectomy with a LR as well as a TI.

Arthrodesis 
Arthrodesis of the CMC1 joint is a surgical procedure in which the trapezium bone and the metacarpal bone of the thumb are secured together. Because the joint is fixed, and therefore can not be moved, the complaints of the patient are mainly gone.During the surgery the two bones will be fixated using K-wires. The use of plates and screws has also been described. The thumb will be positioned in a way it can still perform a pinch grip. Because of the fixation, the two bones will fuse together. This will occur usually within four to six weeks.

However, this technique has some disadvantages. The palm of the hand is unable to be flattened, making it difficult to wear gloves or put your hand in a pocket.
Because the stress on the CMC1 joint is now divided over the other joints, those joints are more likely to be damaged.

Nevertheless, this procedure can be used in patients with stage II and III CMC OA as well as in young people with posttraumatic OA.

Joint Replacement 
There are several prostheses available for use although they have not been widely successful. The goal is to create a stable artificial joint by replacing the old affected joint with new material. Newer prostheses tend to have better results than older ones. Prostheses come in many varieties, such as spacers or resurfacing prostheses.

The total CMC1 joint replacement is a newer arthroplasty which has developed into a cemented and a non-cemented design. The cement acts as a binding factor for fixation of the prosthesis to the host bone. The non-cemented procedure is a good option to treat stage II and III OA and could be better on short-term than the trapeziectomy with LRTI. However, on the longer term, literature indicates the contrary.

Overall, joint replacements are related to long-term complications such as subluxation, fractures, synovitis (due to the material used) and nerve damaging. In many cases revision surgery is needed to either remove or repair the prosthesis. Also note that usage of a joint replacement is heavy in costs.

The quality of the prostheses is improving and there is reason to believe this will have a positive effect on outcome in the years to follow.

Metacarpal osteotomy 
The aim of this procedure is to change the pressure distribution on the CMC1 joint, so it can function without further damaging the joint. That is why a successful osteotomy requires a CMC1 joint of reasonable condition. Therefore, the metacarpal osteotomy should be limited to patients with a stage I-II CMC OA.

An osteotomy is a surgical procedure wherein bone fragments are modified by cutting the bone.

During this procedure an abduction osteotomy of the proximal end of the first metacarpal bone is performed. An incision is made over the radial border of the first metacarpal bone. A wedged shape bone fragment  is removed, causing the distal part of the metacarpal bone to tilt towards its desired position. Postoperative, the thumb of the patient is immobilized using a thumb-cast.

Possible complications are non-union of the bone, persistent pain related to unrecognized CMC or pantrapezial disease and radial sensory nerve injury.

Complications 
The most common complication after surgery is pain persisting in the thumb. Over long term, there is pain relief, but on short term, patients experience pain from the surgery itself. The main complaint is a burning sensation or hypersensitivity over the incision.
Some patients develop a complex regional pain syndrome. This is a syndrome of chronic pain with changes of temperature and colour of the skin.

Other general complications include radial nerve damage and postoperative wound infection.

After arthrodesis, non-union, in which fusion of the trapezium bone with the metacarpal bone fails, occurs in 8% to 21% of the cases.

Subluxation of a prosthesis is a complication where the prosthesis is mobile and is partially dislocated. When the prosthesis is fully dislocated it is called a luxation. Both are painful and need revision surgery so the prosthesis can be repaired or removed.
When using a prosthesis over a longer period of time, there is a chance of breaking the prosthesis itself. This is due to mechanical wear.

Prostheses might also cause a reaction of the body against the artificial material they are made of, resulting in local inflammation.

Epidemiology

CMC OA is the most common form of OA affecting the hand. Dahaghin et al. showed that about 15% of women and 7% of men between 50 and 60 years of age develop CMC OA of the thumb. However, in about 65% of people older than 55 years, radiologic evidence of OA was present without any symptoms. Armstrong et al. reported a prevalence of 33% in postmenopausal women, of which one third was symptomatic, compared to 11% in men older than 55 years. This shows CMC OA of the thumb is significantly more prevalent in women, especially in postmenopausal women, compared to men.

References

Arthritis
Skeletal disorders